Pekmez is a molasses-like syrup obtained after condensing juices of fruit must, especially grape by boiling it with a coagulant agent like wood ashes or ground carob seeds. It is used as a syrup or mixed with tahini for breakfast. In Azerbaijan, pekmez is also mixed with natural yogurt and consumed as a refreshment during summer time.

Etymology 
Pekmez is etymologically Oghuz Turkic in origin and it was called bekmes in the past. The oldest written account of the word is recorded in 1073 dictionary Dīwān Lughāt al-Turk by Mahmud al-Kashgari.

History
Fruit molasses, defrutum, goes back to the classical period.

During the Byzantine era, the region of Trapezus (modern Trebizond) grew mulberry trees for silkworms. Local Armenians used mulberries to make a sweet syrup called petmez or pekmez, a term of Persian origin; the Greeks made grape syrup, siraios (σιραίος). After the Byzantine Empire fell, the term petmez replaced the Greek names for grape syrup in Greek, in the form petimezi.

Regional variants

In Turkey, sugar beet (şeker pancarı), figs (incir) or mulberry (dut) are often used, as well as juniper berries (andiz). Pekmez made from carob (keçiboynuz or harnup) is popularly recommended as a treatment for iron deficiency anemia. In Azerbaijan, pekmez is made mostly from mulberry, grape, rosehip or pomegranates.

In the Balkans, it is more jam-like in texture and usually made of plums. In Greece, it is called petimezi (πετιμέζι).

In Arab cuisine, dibs or dibis (in some regions called "robb" or "rubb") is made from pomegranates, grapes, carob, or dates.

See also
Grape syrup
List of grape dishes
List of syrups
Pomegranate molasses
Date honey

References

Further reading
Ministry of Agriculture in Turkey, archived page

External links

Ottoman cuisine
Sugar substitutes
Syrup
Grape dishes